Elattoneura nigra is a species of damselfly in the family Platycnemididae known commonly as the black threadtail. It is native to Central Africa, where it is widespread. It lives along streams and rivers.

References

Platycnemididae
Odonata of Africa
Insects described in 1938
Taxonomy articles created by Polbot